Judas Christ is the seventh studio album from gothic band Tiamat. The album embraced love themes and was less successful.

Track listing 

Tracks are divided into 4 parts: Spinae (1-4), Tropic of Venus (5-7), Tropic of Capricorn (8-10), Casadores (11-12).
Bonus tracks (13,14) are called "The Hamburg Tapes".

Personnel
 Johan Edlund - guitars & vocals
 Thomas Petersson - guitars
 Anders Iwers - bass
 Lars Sköld - drums & percussion

Additional personnel:

 Out of Phase - keys, programming & dijeridoo
 Maska - violin, sitar & oud

Backing vocals by Trille Palsgaard, Johan Edlund, Anders Iwers, Lars Nissen & Lars Sköld.

Additional guitars by Anders Iwers.

Additional keys by Johand Edlund & Lars Nissen.

Charts

Weekly

Monthly

References

Tiamat (band) albums
2002 albums